Schibsted Media Group is an international media group. The company has its headquarters in Oslo, Norway, and is listed on the Oslo Stock Exchange. The CEO is Kristin Skogen Lund.

In 2019, Schibsted spun off the majority of their online marketplaces business area into a new company called Adevinta. Brands such as Leboncoin.fr and Shpock were included, and stakes in similar websites across Europe were also transferred. As of December 2022 Schibsted continues to hold a 22.8% stake in the company.

History
In 1839 Christian Michael Schibsted founded the publishing company Chr. Schibsteds Forlag and in 1860 he started publishing the newspaper Christiania Adresseblad, from 1885 known as Aftenposten. In 1966 Schibsted also acquired Verdens Gang (VG). These were Norway's two largest newspapers, with VG surpassing Aftenposten in 1981. In 1989, under the leadership of Tinius Nagell-Erichsen, Schibsted went from being a family-owned company to a corporation, and was listed on the Oslo Stock Exchange in 1992. From 1992 to 2006 Schibsted owned part of TV 2, and in 2004 Schibsted bought part of TV 4 Sweden. While retaining the newspapers, the company later shifted its focus from television to Internet market places, running Finn.no,  and Tori.fi.

References

External links
 Official website
Linkedin

Mass media companies of Norway
Holding companies of Norway
Companies based in Oslo
Companies listed on the Oslo Stock Exchange
Multinational companies headquartered in Norway
1839 establishments in Norway
Norwegian brands